Aleksandar Andrejević (born 28 March 1992) is a Serbian footballer who currently plays for Chinese Super League club Qingdao Hainiu as defender.

Club career

FK Příbram
In July 2011, Andrejević moved to FK Příbram for an undisclosed fee. He made his league debut for the club on 1 October 2011 in a 3-0 home defeat to Sparta Prague. He played all ninety minutes of the match.

Donji Srem
In July 2015, Andrejević moved to FK Donji Srem on a free transfer. He made his league debut for the club on 15 August 2015 in a 2-2 home draw with Sinđelić Beograd. He played all ninety minutes of the match.

Proleter Novi Sad
In July 2016, Andrejević moved to FK Proleter Novi Sad on a free transfer. He made his league debut for the club on 14 August 2016 in a 1-1 away draw with Dinamo Vranje. He played all ninety minutes of the match. He scored his first league goal for the club nearly three months later, on 10 September 2016 in a 1-1 away draw with Zemun. His goal, scored in the 39th minute, made the score 1-0 to Proleter.

Gwangju FC
In March 2021, Andrejević moved to Gwangju FC.

Qingdao Hainiu
In March 2023, Andrejević joined Chinese Super League club Qingdao Hainiu.

Honours
Proleter Novi Sad
Serbian First League: 2017–18

References

External links
 
 Aleksandar Andrejević stats at utakmica.rs
 
 

1992 births
Living people
Footballers from Belgrade
Association football defenders
Serbian footballers
OFK Mladenovac players
FK Čukarički players
1. FK Příbram players
FK Timok players
FK Donji Srem players
FK Proleter Novi Sad players
Gwangju FC players
RFK Novi Sad 1921 players
Qingdao Hainiu F.C. (1990) players
Serbian SuperLiga players
Czech First League players
Serbian First League players
K League 1 players
Chinese Super League players
Serbian expatriate footballers
Serbian expatriate sportspeople in the Czech Republic
Expatriate footballers in the Czech Republic
Serbian expatriate sportspeople in South Korea
Expatriate footballers in South Korea
Serbian expatriate sportspeople in China
Expatriate footballers in China
Serbia international footballers